Sherwood Brewer (August 16, 1923 – April 15, 2003) was a member of the Negro leagues.

Early years 
Brewer was born in Clarksdale, Mississippi, and grew up in Centralia, Illinois, raised by his uncle and aunt after his father's death. He was a veteran of the US Army and served in World War II and the Korean War. He served during the Battle of Saipan and participated in a baseball league that began there.

Career 
When Brewer returned from World War II, he spurned offers from Negro league teams to sign with Abe Saperstein's Cincinnati Crescents citing the extra travel associated with the team that he had formed. He began playing in the Negro leagues in 1946. He played for a number of teams including the Chicago American Giants, the Indianapolis Clowns, the Kansas City Monarchs, the Seattle Steelheads, and the Harlem Globetrotters. He also played for the Saskatoon Gems in Canada.

As a professional, Brewer initially played right field before moving to shortstop. He ended up as a second baseman. He also was manager of the Monarchs, the last one before the team ceased to exist.

In 1996, Brewer founded the Negro League Baseball Players Foundation.

Death 
On April 15, 2003, Brewer died at the age of 79.

References

External links
 and Seamheads

Harlem Globetrotters players
Kansas City Monarchs players
African Americans in World War II
1923 births
2003 deaths
Chicago American Giants players
Indianapolis Clowns players
Los Angeles White Sox players
Negro league baseball managers
United States Army personnel of World War II
United States Army personnel of the Korean War
United States Army soldiers
21st-century African-American people
Cincinnati Crescents players
African-American United States Army personnel